Guiscard Bustari was a Florentine Italian adventurer and ambassador, who was employed by the Mongol Il Khan ruler Ghazan. 

In the summer 1300, Guiscard Bustari is recorded to have led an embassy of one hundred Mongols sent by Ghazan to Pope Boniface VIII. The Mongols, clad in traditional clothes, participated to the Jubilee organized by the Pope, and made a sensation. Ghazan asked Pope to send troops, priests, and peasants, in order to make the Holy Land a Frank state again.

Notes

References
Schein, Sylvia, Gesta Dei per Mongolos 1300, The English Historical Review, 1979
Foltz, Richard, Religions of the Silk Road, Palgrave Macmillan, 2nd edition, 2010 

Diplomats from Florence
13th-century people of the Republic of Florence
People of the Ilkhanate
13th-century diplomats
Year of birth missing
Year of death missing